Tallygaroopna Football Netball Club is an Australian rules football club that competes in the Kyabram & District Football League.

The club was established in 1904 and initially competed in the Southern Division of the Goulburn Valley Football Association, and has now competed in the Kyabram & District Football League since 1958.

The club is based in the town of Tallygaroopna in North Eastern Victoria, situated 18 km north of Shepparton.

The club is known as "The Redlegs".

Football Premierships
Goulburn Valley Football Association (1905–1929)
 1915 (Season abandoned in July, 1915. Tallygaroopna declared premiers)
Goulburn Valley Football League – 2nd XVIII (1930–1940)
Nil
Central Goulburn Valley Football League (1947–1952)
 1949 (CGVFL Reserves) 
Picola & District Football League (1953–1957)
Nil
Kyabram District Football Netball League (1958 – present)
Seniors 
 1963, 1971, 1973, 1974, 2005, 2018*
Reserves 
1973, 1974, 1975, 1984, 1991, 1994, 2004, 2012, 2019
Under 18 
2011, 2017

Netball Premierships

Kyabram District Football Netball League

A Grade 
2008
B Grade 
1986, 2003, 2005, 2006, 2008, 2014, 2019
C Grade 
1995, 2001, 2003, 2005, 2016, 2017, 2019*
C Reserve 
2019*
15 & Under 
2015

*Premiers & Champions

References

External links
Official Kyabram and District Football League Website

Kyabram & District Football League clubs
1904 establishments in Australia
Australian rules football clubs established in 1904